Ethminolia elveri is a species of sea snail, a marine gastropod mollusk in the family Trochidae, the top snails.

Description

Distribution
This marine species is endemic to Australia and occurs off South Australia and Western Australia

References

 Cotton, B.C. & Godfrey, F.K. (1938) New species of South Australian Gastropoda. Records of the South Australian Museum, 6, 199–206, pl. 17
 Cotton, B.C. 1959. South Australian Mollusca. Archaeogastropoda. Handbook of the Flora and Fauna of South Australia. Adelaide : South Australian Government Printer 449 pp

elveri
Gastropods of Australia
Gastropods described in 1938